Dwang is a Guang language of Ghana, partially intelligible with Chumburung.

References

External links 
 ELAR archive of Documentation of fishing practices among the Dwang

Guang languages
Languages of Ghana